Krishand RK, who also goes by the mononym Krishand, is an Indian filmmaker, director, screenwriter and cinematographer who works in the Malayalam film industry. He is a recipient of two Kerala State Film Award and a Padmarajan Award for his film Aavasavyuham.

Early life and education
Krishand received his Bachelor of Technology from Mohandas College of Engineering and Technology in Kerala.  He got his Master of Design from IDC School of Design, IIT Mumbai, and is an associate professor there.

Career
Krishand began his career in 2012 as a screen Writer in the short film Flames. He has also scripted and directed the short films, Mombattiyan, 	Bhagavthikaavile Paapikal.

In 2018, the web series Utsaha Ithihasam which was streamed on Zee5, directed by Krishand has received a nomination in the Seoul Webfest and won Best Dramedy award.

In 2018, he made his debut in Malayalam movie industry as a director on the feature film Vrithakrithyilulla Chathuram. It competed in the International Film Festival of Kerala (IFFK)'s international competition category. The film won a Kerala State Film Award for Best Background Music.

His second film,  Aavasavyuham: The Arbit Documentation of an Amphibian Hunt, competed in the 26th IFFK (IFFK 2021). where it won the FIPRESCI and NETPAC Awards for Best Malayalam Film. It also won the Kerala State Film Award for Best Screenplay and Kerala State Film Award for Best Film.

Filmography

Film

Web series

Accolades

Notes

References

External links

Malayalam film directors
Malayali people
Living people
Malayalam film producers
21st-century Indian film directors
IIT Bombay alumni

Year of birth missing (living people)